The Chateau Lacombe is a hotel in Edmonton, Alberta, Canada.

Description
One of Edmonton's major hotels located in downtown Edmonton, the Chateau Lacombe was first opened on 28 December 1966 by the Canadian Pacific Hotels Corporation (CPH). It features 307 rooms in the 24-storey cylindrical tower topped by Edmonton's only revolving restaurant, La Ronde, which offers sweeping views of both the city's downtown core and the North Saskatchewan river valley below as it makes a full rotation every 90 minutes.

In 1988, CPH bought the Canadian National Hotels chain, which included the nearby Hotel Macdonald. In 1991, the newer Chateau Lacombe was rebranded the Holiday Inn Crowne Plaza, though complemented by the original name initially. In 1995, the hotel was renamed the Crowne Plaza Edmonton Chateau Lacombe.

It was sold again in mid-2010 for $47.8m to local company Hargate Properties who retained the affiliation with Crowne Plaza Hotels but the new owners went into receivership in November 2011. The purchase of the hotel by Kevyn Frederick in 2010 later was discovered to be part of a large mortgage fraud in the Edmonton area.

The hotel was bought out of receivership by the new ownership group for $27.5m in 2012, and in May 2013 the hotel was relaunched as an independent hotel.

Name
The hotel is named after Father Albert Lacombe, an Oblate missionary and pioneer priest instrumental in the foundation and settlement of Alberta in the late 1800s.

References

Hotels in Edmonton
Hotels established in 1966
Canadian Pacific Railway hotels